Vyacheslav Velyev (born 21 May 2000) is a Ukrainian professional footballer who plays as a defender for Bulgarian club Pirin Blagoevgrad.

Career

Chornomorets
A product of the club's youth academy, Velyev made his league debut for the club on 10 August 2019, coming on as a 76th minute substitute for Volodymyr Tanchyk in a 1–0 away defeat to Mynai.

References

External links
Vyacheslav Velyev at SofaScore
 
 

2000 births
Living people
Footballers from Odesa
Ukrainian footballers
Association football defenders
Ukrainian people of Bulgarian descent
FC Chornomorets Odesa players
FC Chornomorets-2 Odesa players
FC Mariupol players
FC Hirnyk-Sport Horishni Plavni players
FC Peremoha Dnipro players
OFC Pirin Blagoevgrad players
Ukrainian Premier League players
Ukrainian First League players
Ukrainian Second League players
First Professional Football League (Bulgaria) players
Ukrainian expatriate footballers
Expatriate footballers in Bulgaria
Ukrainian expatriate sportspeople in Bulgaria